Raphael Maier (born 9 August 1992) is an Austrian skeleton racer. He is a participant at the 2014 Winter Olympics in Sochi.

References

1992 births
Skeleton racers at the 2014 Winter Olympics
Living people
Olympic skeleton racers of Austria
Austrian male skeleton racers
20th-century Austrian people
21st-century Austrian people